Wabigoon could refer to:

 Wabigoon Lake
 Wabigoon River
 Wabigoon Lake Ojibway Nation
 Wabigoon, Ontario